Lyfe 268‒192 is the debut album by American recording artist Lyfe Jennings. It was released on August 17, 2004 and has sold at least one million copies in the US. The album's title contains the numbers "268–192", the identification number he was given while incarcerated.

It was re-issued in 2005 as a special edition with two new remix tracks.

Track listing
 All tracks written and produced by Lyfe Jennings, except where noted.

Charts

Weekly charts

Year-end charts

References

Lyfe Jennings albums
2004 debut albums
Columbia Records albums
Articles containing video clips